Klugajny  (German Klogehnen) is a village in the administrative district of Gmina Miłakowo, within Ostróda County, Warmian-Masurian Voivodeship, in northern Poland.

References

Klugajny